Government Girls Degree College Mathra Peshawar is public sector college located in Mathra, Peshawar Khyber Pakhtunkhwa, Pakistan. The college offers programs for intermediate level and is affiliated with Board of Intermediate And Secondary Education Peshawar. The college also offers BA & BSc degree programs which are affiliated with University of Peshawar.

Overview & History 
Government Girls Degree College Mathra Peshawar started working from September 2011. The campus of college is sprawling over an area of 34.54 Kanals. The campus has academic and administration block, student hostel, spacious classrooms, well equipped science laboratories and a library with latest books. The college also provides transport facility for its students.

Faculties And Departments 
The college currently has the following faculties and departments.
 Department of Botany
 Department of Chemistry
 Department of Computer Science
 Department of Economics
 Department of English
 Department of Geography
 Department of History
 Department of Home Economics
 Department of Islamiyat
 Department of Law
 Department of Library Sciences
 Department of Mathematics
 Department of Pakistan Studies
 Department of Physics
 Department of Political Science
 Department of Psychology
 Department of Pushto
 Department of Statistics
 Department of Urdu
 Department of Zoology

See also 
 Edwardes College Peshawar
 Islamia College Peshawar
 Government Girls Degree College Hayatabad Peshawar

References

External links 
 Government Girls Degree College Mathra Peshawar Official Website

Colleges in Peshawar
Universities and colleges in Peshawar